The 1949 Grand National was the 103rd renewal of the Grand National horse race that took place at Aintree Racecourse near Liverpool, England, on 26 March 1949.

The race was won by a 66/1 shot Russian Hero, a comfortable eight lengths ahead of his nearest challenger. Russian Hero was ridden by jockey Leo McMorrow and trained by George Owen, winning the top prize of £13,000 for owner Fearnie Williamson.

Forty-three horses ran; Roimond finished second, with Royal Mount third and Cromwell fourth.

Bora's Cottage was a fatality on the second circuit.

Finishing order

Non-finishers

References

 1949
Grand National
Grand National
Grand National
20th century in Lancashire